The following lists events that happened in 1999 in Iceland.

Incumbents
President – Ólafur Ragnar Grímsson 
Prime Minister – Davíð Oddsson

 
1990s in Iceland
Iceland
Iceland
Years of the 20th century in Iceland